Simon James Towns  (born 17 September 1972, in Wellington) is a field hockey player from New Zealand, who earned his first cap for the national team, nicknamed The Black Sticks, in 1992 against Kenya. In the 2007 New Year Honours he was appointed a Member of the New Zealand Order of Merit for services to hockey.

International senior tournaments
 1995 – Sultan Azlan Shah Cup
 1997 – World Cup Qualifier, Kuala Lumpur
 1998 – Sultan Azlan Shah Cup
 1998 – World Cup
 1998 – Commonwealth Games
 1999 – Sultan Azlan Shah Cup
 2000 – Sultan Azlan Shah Cup
 2000 – Olympic Qualifying Tournament
 2001 – World Cup Qualifier, Edinburgh
 2002 – World Cup
 2002 – Commonwealth Games
 2003 – Sultan Azlan Shah Cup
 2003 – Champions Challenge
 2004 – Olympic Qualifying Tournament
 2004 – Summer Olympics
 2004 – Champions Trophy
 2005 – Sultan Azlan Shah Cup
 2011 – NYCFHC Man of the Match, vs Greenwich 2s

References

External links
 

1972 births
Living people
New Zealand male field hockey players
Olympic field hockey players of New Zealand
Commonwealth Games silver medallists for New Zealand
Commonwealth Games medallists in field hockey
Field hockey players at the 1998 Commonwealth Games
1998 Men's Hockey World Cup players
Field hockey players at the 2002 Commonwealth Games
2002 Men's Hockey World Cup players
Field hockey players at the 2004 Summer Olympics
Field hockey players from Wellington City
Members of the New Zealand Order of Merit
Hampstead & Westminster Hockey Club players
Medallists at the 2002 Commonwealth Games